The Glamorgan County Council election, 1898 was the fourth contest for seats on this authority. It was preceded by the 1895 election and followed by the 1901 election. Glamorgan was by far the largest county in Wales in terms of population. Glamorgan County Council had been established by the 1888 Local Government Act, and the first elections held in early 1889. The county of Glamorgan was at this time becoming heavily industrialised, although some areas such as the Vale of Glamorgan remained essentially rural. The rise of nonconformist liberalism, especially since the 1860s, throughout Wales, had challenged the prevailing influence of the landed gentry. However, even in 1889, the traditional forces remained influential and no working men were elected to the Council. This changed in 1892 with the unopposed return of David Morgan in Aberdare and the success of Isaac Evans in Resolven.

Overview of the result
As in most parts of Wales, the Liberal Party was once again triumphant and won a majority of the seats. In 1895 there were more unopposed results than in previous elections and the Conservatives made some headway, reflecting the position in the United Kingdom as a whole where the party took power that year.

Results are drawn from a number of sources. The include an account of unopposed returns in the Evening Express, and results from the same newspaper as well as the Cambrian  and Pontypridd Chronicle.

Boundary changes
There were no boundary changes at this election.

Retiring aldermen
All eleven retiring aldermen were Liberals. Gwilym Jones, W.H. Mathias, J.C. Meggitt, Herbert Evans and the Rev Aaron Davies all sought re-election. Jones and Mathias were returned unopposed while Meggitt's only opponent withdrew before polling day. Herbert Evans was opposed by the sitting Liberal councillor whom he eventually narrowly defeated (see Cwmavon, below). Aaron Davies was defeated at Pontlottyn. At Aberdare, David Price Davies was also nominated but withdrew rather than face a contest with the sitting councillor.

Contested elections

Results

Aberaman

Aberavon

Aberdare Town
Prior to the election it became apparent that Evans, the sitting councillor and the retiring alderman, David Price Davies, both coveted the seats. Davies however withdrew before the poll.

Barry

The sitting councillor, John Cory, had withdrawn in favour of retiring alderman John Claxton Meggitt. The defeated candidate withdrew before polling day.

Blaengwawr

Cadoxton

Bridgend

Briton Ferry
Jenkin Hill recaptured the seat he lost three years previously.

Caeharris

Caerphilly
A narrow victory.

Cilfynydd
W.R. Davies took the place of Henry Lewis, who did not seek re-election after one term. Davies was chosen as a candidate after a public meeting of local Liberals where both candidates agreed to abide by the vote.

Coedffranc

Coity

Cowbridge

Cwmavon
Two Liberals, a sitting alderman and sitting councillor, opposed each other.

Cyfarthfa
Thomas Thomas recaptured the seat he lost three years previously.

Cymmer

Dinas Powys

Dowlais

Dulais Valley

Ferndale
David Thomas JP, who had ousted fellow Liberal Morgan Williams in 1895, did not seek re-election due to  ill-health leading to a contrast between the Rev Silas Charles, Congregational Minister and Thomas Samuel, grocer.

Gadlys

Garw Valley

Gellifaelog

Gelligaer

Gower

Kibbor

Llandaff

Llandeilo Talybont

Llansamlet

Llantrisant

Llwydcoed

Llwynypia and Clydach

Lougher and Penderry

Maesteg
The same two candidates had faced each other in 1895. On that occasion, Barrow had won and was elected as alderman for a three-year period. Jenkin Jones was then returned at a by-election.

Margam

Merthyr Town

Merthyr Vale

Morriston

Mountain Ash

Neath (North)

Neath (South)
At the previous election, Trick had stood as a Conservative.

Newcastle

Ogmore

Ogmore Valley

Oystermouth

Penarth North

Penarth South

Penrhiwceiber

Pentre
Morris appears to have defected to the Unionists, leading to his defeat. This was considered to be the most significant contest in the valley but, owing to the support of colliery officials and leading tradesmen for the winning candidate, Elias Henry Davies, it was clear that Morris and been defeated before the close of the poll.  Davies was an active Congregationalist, freemason and president of the Rhondda Cymmrodorion.

Penydarren

Pontardawe

Plymouth

Pontlottyn
Although a Liberal gain, the shock was the defeat of Alderman Aaron Davies.

Pontypridd

Porth and Penygraig

Resolven

Sketty
A repeat of the contest in 1895, with the same result.

Swansea Valley
Boundary Change

Treforest
James Roberts had won the seat at a by-election following the death of the previous member, David Leyshon. His defeat was greeted with surprise by a crowd said to number 4,000 who had gathered to hear the result. Roberts said he was glad to think that he had been the means of overthrowing a member of a 'Pontypridd clique'.

Treherbert

Treorchy

Trealaw and Tonypandy

Tylorstown and Ynyshir

Ystalyfera

Ystrad

Election of aldermen

In addition to the 66 councillors the council consisted of 22 county aldermen. Aldermen were elected by the council, and served a six-year term. Following the 1898 election, there were twelve Aldermanic vacancies. These comprised the eleven vacancies due to retiring alderman with the twelfth being vacant following the death of Isaac Evans.

The following aldermen were appointed by the newly elected council.

elected for six years

Gwilym Jones, Liberal, retiring alderman (elected councillor at Mountain Ash)
W.H. Mathias, Liberal, retiring alderman (elected councillor at Tylorstown and Ynyshir)
J.C. Meggitt, Liberal, retiring alderman (elected councillor at Barry)
Llewellyn Davies, Liberal (elected councillor at Swansea Valley)
T.J. Hughes, Liberal (elected councillor at Newcastle)
William Llewellyn, Liberal (elected councillor at Ogmore Valley)
J.W. Evans, Liberal (elected councillor at Aberdare Town)
William Howell, Liberal (elected councillor at Coity)
Rees Harris, Liberal (elected councillor at Llandeilo Talybont)
David Prosser, Liberal (elected councillor at Merthyr Vale)
Dr R.W. Jones, Liberal (elected councillor at Penrhiwceber)

elected for three years
Daniel Evans, Liberal (elected councillor at Resolven)

All eleven aldermen were Liberals, as were the retiring aldermen.

By-elections

Aberdare Town by-election
Following the return of J.W. Evans, David Price Davies and Thomas Thomas (councillor for the ward from 1892 until 1895) were nominated. However, Thomas withdrew allowing Davies to be returned unopposed.

Barry by-election
John Cory had been a member of the county council since its formation, and served as alderman from 1889 until 1892. Captain Murrell, in returning thanks for his election, said he came forward as an independent candidate as a protest against the introduction of the foreign element into the representation of the district.

Coity by-election

Llandeilo Talybont by-election

Merthyr Vale by-election

Mountain Ash by-election

Newcastle by-election

Ogmore Valley by-election

Penrhiwceiber by-election
Following the election of Dr R.W. Jones as an alderman, Thomas Morris, who had represented Mountain Ash on the previous council, was elected. Morris was opposed by another Liberal candidate, clerk to the Llanwonno School Board, who stood in opposition to Morris's links to the beer trade. John Williams, checkweigher at a  local colliery and a future Labour MP was a possible candidate but withdrew at an early stage.

Resolven by-election

Swansea Valley by-election

Tylorstown and Ynyshir by-election

By-elections 1898-1901

Dowlais by-election
A by-election was held in Dowlais ward in October 1899 following the elevation of Thomas Jenkins to the aldermanic bench. John Davies, the local miners' agent defeated an Independent candidate, a local chemist.

References

Bibliography

1898
1898 Welsh local elections
19th century in Glamorgan